Mathias Payer (born 1981) is a Liechtensteinian computer scientist. His research is invested in software and system security. He is Associate Professor at the École Polytechnique Fédérale de Lausanne (EPFL) and head of the HexHive research group .

Career 
Mathias Payer studied computer science at ETH Zurich and received his master's degree in 2006. He then joined the Laboratory for Software Technology of Thomas R. Gross at ETH Zurich as a PhD student and graduated with a thesis on secure execution in 2012, focusing on techniques to mitigate control-flow hijacking attacks. In 2010, he was working at Google as software security engineer in the anti-malware and anti-phishing team, where he was dedicated detecting novel malware. In 2012, he joined Dawn Song's BitBlaze group at University of California, Berkeley as a postdoctoral scholar working on the analysis and classification of memory errors. In 2014, he received an appointment as Assistant Professor from Purdue University, where he founded his research laboratory, the HexHive Group. In 2018 he moved to EPFL as an assistant professor in Computer Science  and received tenure in 2021.  The HexHive Group is now located on the Lausanne Campus of EPFL.

Research 

Payer's research centers on software and systems security. He develops and refines tools that enable software developers to discover and patch software bugs, and thereby rendering their programs for resilient to potential software exploits. To reach this goal Payer employs two strategies. The first one are sanitization techniques that point to security issues of factors such as memory, type safety and API flow safety, and thereby enabling more salient products. The second are fuzzing techniques that create a set of input data for programs by combining static and dynamic analysis. The novel input data set extend and complement the set of existing test vectors. Using this newly created input data helps to uncover exploitable vulnerabilities, such as control-flow integrity making use of specific language semantics, requiring type integrity, and safeguarding selective data.

Payer's research has led to the discovery of several software vulnerabilities. Among them are the Bluetooth bugs BLURtooth and BLESA, and USBFuzz, a vulnerability that affects the implementation of USB protocol parsing across mayor operating systems.

Payer has been contributing to the development of the Decentralized Privacy-Preserving Proximity (DP-3T) protocol, on which the SwissCovid mobile application is built. The app allows for anonymous contact tracing to mitigate the COVID-19 pandemic.

Payer assisted the creation of the startup company xorlab that a former student of his, Antonio Barresi, founded.

He gained recognition beyond his research field through his lectures at the CCC - Chaos Communication Congress, the BHEU-Black Hat Europe, and others.

Distinctions 
He received the SNSF Eccellenza Award, and gained an ERC Starting Grant.

Selected works

References

External links 
 
 Website of the HexHive Group

1981 births
Living people
ETH Zurich alumni
University of California, Berkeley alumni
Academic staff of the École Polytechnique Fédérale de Lausanne
Liechtenstein people
Liechtenstein men by occupation